Gladiata is a genus of spiders in the family Linyphiidae. It was first described in 2014 by Zhao & Li. , it contains only one species, Gladiata fengli, found in China.

References

Linyphiidae
Monotypic Araneomorphae genera
Spiders of China